Brazil sent a delegation to compete at the 2008 Summer Olympics in Beijing, China, in August 2008. Brazilian athletes have competed in every Summer Olympic Games since 1920, except the 1928 Summer Olympics. The country is represented by the Brazilian Olympic Committee (COB – Comitê Olímpico Brasileiro). Brazil headed to the Beijing Games with its largest Olympic delegation at the time, 277 athletes, including 132 women.

The 17 medals won by Brazil topped the previous medal count record set in 1996, and included the first individual medal and the first individual gold earned by women, by judoka Ketleyn Quadros and jumper Maurren Maggi, respectively.  Three of the medals were gold, by Maggi, swimmer César Cielo and the female volleyball team.

Brazil won the first medal ever in taekwondo, when Natália Falavigna won the bronze medal in women's +67 kg. Brazil also won its first gold medal ever in swimming, achieved by César Cielo in men's 50 m freestyle.

Summary
Brazil was the 39th nation to enter the Beijing National Stadium during the Olympic opening ceremony. Sailor Robert Scheidt (1996, 2000 and 2004 medalist) was the flag bearer at the opening ceremony.

The swimmer César Cielo was the first Brazilian swimmer to be gold medalist, when he conquered the gold medal in men's 50 m freestyle, with an Olympic record. Raised to the post of new hero of the national sport, he had previously won in Beijing the bronze medal in the 100 m freestyle a result that confirmed his position of new standout in the tests of speed of swimming.

The jumper Maurren Maggi reached 7.04m in the final of the women's long jump and surpassed, in just one centimeter, the Russian Tatyana Lebedeva. Maurren won gold and became the first Brazilian woman in history to win the gold medal, not only in Athletics but also in an individual event of any sport in the Olympic Games. Maurren Maggi, was the flag bearer at the 2008 Summer Olympics closing ceremony.

It was also in 2008 Summer Olympics that one of the most popular sports in Brazil finally saw women win Olympic gold: the volleyball. Four years earlier, in Athens, the Brazil women's national volleyball team, led by coach José Roberto Guimarães, champion with the men's team at the 1992 Barcelona Games, had been very close to the dreamy Olympic decision when, in the semifinal against Russia, got the advantage of 24/19 in the fourth set (the Brazilians led by 2 sets to 1). Incredibly, although it needed just one more point to close the match, the Brazilians allowed a spectacular turn of the Russians in the fourth set. Not only did they lose that quarter-final by 28/26, like the game after a 16/14 loss in the tie-break. They would also lose the bronze medal for the Cuba. The trauma of Athens, however, was completely erased in Beijing. With a perfect campaign of eight wins, highlighted by the statistics of only one set lost in all the tournament, Brazil was the champion by defeating the United States in the decision by 3 to 1. José Roberto Guimarães entered history as the only coach to have taken a male and a female teams Olympic gold.

The Brazil men's national volleyball team was silver medalist of the tournament, losing the gold medal match by 3 to 1 to United States. In the beach volleyball two medals were conquered in the men's tournament. Márcio Araújo and Fábio Luiz Magalhães were silver medalists, losing the gold medal match to Americans Todd Rogers and Phil Dalhausser. The bronze medal was obtained by Ricardo Santos and Emanuel Rego.

At the football the Brazil women's national football team won the silver medal. The team advanced to the final against United States and lost by 1–0 at extra time. The Brazil national under-23 football team was the bronze medalist in the men's tournament.

The sailors Robert Scheidt and Bruno Prada were silver medalists in Star class. This was Robert Scheidt's fourth of his 5 Olympic medals. Also in the sailing, Fernanda Oliveira and Isabel Swan were the bronze medalists in Women's 470 class, becoming the first Brazilian women to win an Olympic medal in sailing.

Brazilian judokas won three more podiums for Brazil. Leandro Guilheiro was the bronze medalist in men's 73 kg while Thiago Camilo won the bronze in men's 81 kg category. Ketleyn Quadros was the bronze medalist in women's 57 kg. She was the first Brazilian judoka woman to win an Olympic medal and also the first Brazilian woman to conquer a medal in an individual sport.

The taekwondo athlete Natália Falavigna won the bronze medal in women's +67 kg category. This was the first Olympic medal ever won by Brazil in the Taekwondo.

Finally two more bronze medals were awarded to Brazilian athletes, several years after the 2008 Summer Olympics, due to doping violations. Both medals were in the athletics. Originally won by Russia, the gold medal of women's 4 × 100 m relay was stripped due to anti-doping rules violation by Yulia Chermoshanskaya. Following medals reallocation, Belgium was awarded gold, Nigeria – silver and Brazil – bronze. Rosemar Coelho Neto, Lucimar de Moura, Thaissa Presti and Rosângela Santos received the bronze medals in March 2017 at the Prêmio Brasil Olímpico ceremony in Rio de Janeiro.

Jamaican team originally won gold medals in Men's 4 × 100 m relay but was disqualified due to anti-doping rules violation by Nesta Carter. The Court of Arbitration for Sport decided in 2018 that Trinidad and Tobago is the winner, the silver medal was reallocated to Japan and the bronze to Brazil team, which was formed by sprinters Vicente de Lima, Sandro Viana, Bruno de Barros and José Carlos Moreira.

Medalists

| width=78% align=left valign=top |

|  style="text-align:left; width:22%; vertical-align:top;"|

Multiple medallist

The following competitor won several medals at the 2008 Olympic Games.

Archery

Luiz Trainini qualified by placing third at the Pan American Continental Qualification Tournament, held in San Salvador, El Salvador, October 2007.

Athletics

Men
Track & road events

Field events

Combined events – Decathlon

Women
Track & road events

Field events

Combined events – Heptathlon

* The athlete who finished in second place, Lyudmila Blonska of the Ukraine, tested positive for a banned substance. Both the A and the B tests were positive, therefore Blonska was stripped of her silver medal, and da Silva moved up a position.

Basketball

Women's tournament
Roster

Group play

Boxing

Canoeing

Slalom

Sprint 

Qualification Legend: QS = Qualify to semi-final; QF = Qualify directly to final

Cycling

Road

Mountain biking

Diving 

César Castro qualified a spot to Brazil at the FINA World Championship, while Cassius Duran, Juliana Veloso and Hugo Parisi qualified at the FINA Diving World Cup.

Men

Women

Equestrian

The dressage and eventing teams qualified by taking bronze medals at the team Competition at the 2007 Pan American Games, while the jumping team qualified by taking the gold medal at the team Competition at the 2007 Pan American Games.

Dressage

Eventing

# – Indicates that points do not count in team total

Show jumping

* Pessoa was disqualified after his horse Rufus was tested positive of Nonivamide; thus, all of his scores, both individual and team, had dropped towards last place.

Fencing

Men

Football

Men's tournament

Brazil qualified by winning the 2007 South American Youth Championship.
 Men's team event – 1 team of 18 players

Roster

Group play

Quarterfinals

Semifinals

Bronze medal game

Final rank

Women's tournament

Brazil women's national football team is in Group B with Korea DPR, Germany and Nigeria. Brazil (CONMEBOL runner-up, second in the 2006 Sudamericano Femenino) qualified by defeating  (CAF runner-up, second in the qualifying tournament).
 Women's team event – 1 team of 18 players

Roster

Group play

Quarterfinals

Semifinals

Gold medal game

Final rank

Gymnastics

Artistic
Diego Hypólito qualified by placing 17th at the 2007 World Artistic Gymnastics Championships in the men's team all-around competition, and the women's team qualified by placing 5th at the 2007 World Artistic Gymnastics Championships in the women's team all-around competition.

Men

Women
Team

Individual finals

Rhythmic 
A group qualified by placing 11th at the 2007 World Rhythmic Gymnastics Championships in the group all-around competition.

Handball

Brazil has qualified for both the men's and women's events by winning the 2007 Pan American Games.
 Men's team event – 1 team of 14 players
 Women's team event – 1 team of 14 players

Men's tournament

Roster

Group play

Women's tournament

Roster

Group play

Judo 

Qualification spots were won at the 2007 World Judo Championships and the Pan-American Judo Union Championships.

Men

Women

Modern pentathlon

Rowing 

Men

Women

Qualification Legend: FA=Final A (medal); FB=Final B (non-medal); FC=Final C (non-medal); FD=Final D (non-medal); FE=Final E (non-medal); FF=Final F (non-medal); SA/B=Semifinals A/B; SC/D=Semifinals C/D; SE/F=Semifinals E/F; QF=Quarterfinals; R=Repechage

Sailing

Men

Women

Open

M = Medal race; EL = Eliminated – did not advance into the medal race; CAN = Race cancelled;

Shooting

Men

Swimming

Men

Women

Synchronized swimming

Lara Teixeira and Nayara Figueira qualified at the Olympic Qualifying Tournament in Beijing.

Table tennis

Gustavo Tsuboi, Thiago Monteiro and Mariany Nonaka all qualified at the 18th Latin American Championship.

Singles

Team

Taekwondo

Tennis

Triathlon

Volleyball

Beach

Indoor
Brazil qualified a team to both the men's and the women's tournaments. The men's team won all their group matches but one, and advanced to the final round. There, they won both the quarterfinal and the semifinal, but lost the gold medal game, having to settle for the silver medal.

The women's team went through the tournament undefeated, winning all their games, and ultimately becoming the Olympic champions.

Men's tournament

Brazil qualified by winning the 2007 FIVB Men's World Cup.

Roster

Preliminary round

Quarterfinal

Semifinal

Gold medal game

Women's tournament

Brazil qualified by being runner-up at the 2007 FIVB Women's World Cup.

Roster

Preliminary round

Quarterfinal

Semifinal

Gold medal game

Weightlifting

Wellison Silva qualified at the 2008 Pan American Weightlifting Championships.

Wrestling

Women's freestyle

See also
 Brazil at the 2008 Summer Paralympics
 Brazil at the 2007 Pan American Games
 Brazil at the Olympics
 Sports in Brazil

References
COB's listing
Brazilian Olympic Team

Notes

Nations at the 2008 Summer Olympics
2008
Summer Olympics